Sugganahalli Rudramurthy Shastry (born 11 November 1948), is a Kannada novelist and lyricist whose works are popular in state of Karnataka, India. He has written lyrics to more than 100 films, screenplay and dialogues for ten Kannada movies, story to biographical historical drama film Gandugali Kumara Rama, and screenplay and dialogues to many Kannada TV serials.

Biography

Early life 
Su Rudramurthy Shastry was born at Suggenahalli, a village in the Magadi taluk, Bengaluru Rural District, about 70 km from Bengaluru. His father is S N Shivarudrayya, and mother is Siddagangamma.

Education 
Primary education from Sugganahalli, Magadi taluk, and highschool education from Ramangara, MA(Kannada) from Bangalore University, Bengaluru.

Works
He has written more than 130 books including 16 poetry works, more than 30 historical, fiction, social novels, more than 23 story collections.

Collections of Poems
Pari
Antaranga-Bahiranga
Chitra Kalpane
Naadaroopaka
Kempana Vachanagalu
Alpajjana Vachanagalu

Novels
Aurangajeba
BaNNada Hakki
Bheeshma
Chanakya
Chaarudatta
Dharma Chakravarthi Ashoka
Kanakadaasa
Kumara Rama
MaNNina Rhuna
Raadharajani
Sarvajna
Swapna Gaana

Other books
Arabian Nights Kathegalu
Basava Vachana Sangraha 
Kanaka Daasara Padagalu (1997), Bhagya Laksmi Publishers, Bengaluru
Durasimhana Panchatantra, IBH Publications, Bengaluru
Bharatada Charitre - Makkaligagi Sachitra 
Harihara Kaviya Ragale Kathegalu 
Sarvajnana Vachana Sangraha

Su Rudramurthy Shastry's works on screen

Movies
 Gandugali Kumara Rama
 Hosamane Aliya

TV serials
Anna Basavanna
Venkatesha Mahime
NaLa Damayanthi
Vikrama and Bethala
 Maha Bharatha

See also
 Kannada
 Kannada literature

References

Screenwriters from Bangalore
Kannada-language writers
Living people
Kannada people
1984 births
Kannada-language lyricists